Opsilia malachitica is a species of beetle from the family Cerambycidae found in Algeria, Spain, Morocco, Portugal, Sicily and Tunisia.

References

Beetles described in 1849
malachitica